Husa is a village in the Ølve district of Kvinnherad municipality in Vestland county, Norway. The village is located at the end of a small bay off the main Hardangerfjorden.

References

Villages in Vestland
Kvinnherad